Pomaderris buchanensis is a species of flowering plant in the family Rhamnaceae and is endemic to Victoria, Australia. It is a shrub with densely hairy young stems, narrowly egg-shaped or lance-shaped leaves, and panicles of pale greenish or yellowish flowers.

Description
The lower surface of the leaves is densely covered with star-shaped hairs. Flowering occurs in November and December.

Taxonomy
Pomaderris buchanensis was first formally described in 2008 by Neville Grant Walsh in the journal Muelleria from specimens he collected near the junction of the Buchan and Snowy Rivers in 2003. The specific epithet (buchanensis) refers to the type location near the township of Buchan in eastern Victoria.

Distribution and habitat
This pomaderris grows in shrubland on the rocky banks of the Snowy River in the Snowy River National Park.

References

buchanensis
Flora of Victoria (Australia)
Plants described in 2008